288 may refer to:

The year 288 AD
The year 288 BC
The number 288
The Ferrari 288 GTO, an automobile
The USS Cabrilla (SS-288), a USN submarine
The USS Worden (DD-288), a USN destroyer
The Bagger 288 excavator
288 Glauke, an asteroid discovered in 1890
List of highways numbered 288